36–42 Coney Street is a historic terrace in the city centre of York, in England.

The oldest part of the terrace is the rear part of 36 Coney Street, which is a three-storey timber framed structure built in the early 17th century, and later encased in brick.  Two three-storey brick houses were constructed next to it, one in the mid-18th century, and one slightly later.  In the 1780s, a terrace of three four-storey houses was built at the front of the site, facing onto Coney Street.  38 and 40 Coney Street are of similar size, while 36 Coney Street extends further back, lit in part by a light well.  In the late 19th century, 36 Coney Street was extended further back, and incorporated the buildings at the rear.

The ground floor of each of the former houses is now a shop, and the shop windows of the whole terrace are decorated in the same style, incorporating tulip motifs.  A passageway between 36 and 38 leads to the rear yard.  Inside, some early plasterwork survives on the upper floors, as do several fireplaces.  The 17th century block has an original staircase, and 38 and 40 have 18th century staircases.

In the early 20th century, 36 Coney Street was the local headquarters of the Women's Social and Political Union, a fact now commemorated by a plaque.  The shop was occupied by Currys until 2017, and The Entertainer toy shop since 2018.

The building was Grade II* listed in 1983.

References

Coney Street
Coney Street 36